Strong ale is a type of ale, usually above 5% abv and often higher, between 7% to 11% abv, which spans a number of beer styles, including old ale, barley wine and Burton ale. Strong ales are brewed throughout Europe and beyond, including in England, Belgium and the United States.

"Scotch ale" was first used as a designation for strong ales exported from Edinburgh in the 18th century. Scotch ale is sometimes termed "wee heavy".

See also
 Christmas beer
 List of beer styles
 Trappist beer

References

Types of beer